Ariana is a historical term for a region of central Asia.

Ariana may also refer to:

 Ariana (name), a given name

Places
Ariana Governorate, Tunisia
Ariana, or Aryanah, coastal town
Lake Ariana, in Sofia, Bulgaria

Other uses
Ariana beer, a Bulgarian beer brand
 Ariana Brewery, a former Bulgarian brewery
Ariana Afghan Airlines, flag carrier of Afghanistan
Ariana Television Network, based in Kabul, Afghanistan
Ariana Afghanistan, a satellite television channel based in California, U.S.
Ariana Cinema, in Kabul, Afghanistan

See also
Ariadna (disambiguation)
Ariadne (disambiguation)
Arianna (disambiguation)
Ariane (disambiguation)
Aria (region), sometimes confused with Ariana
Aryana (TV series)